Walter Ehle (28 April 1913 – 18 November 1943) was a Luftwaffe night fighter ace and recipient of the Knight's Cross of the Iron Cross during World War II. The Knight's Cross of the Iron Cross was awarded to recognise extreme battlefield bravery or successful military leadership. Walter Ehle claimed 39 aerial victories, 35 of them at night.

Early life and career
Ehle was born on 28 April 1913 in Windhuk in German South West Africa, present-day Windhoek is the capital and largest city of the Republic of Namibia.

World War II
At the start of the war Ehle flew with 3./ZG 1 and was credited with three daylight kills before the unit was redesignated 3./Nachtjagdgeschwader 1 (NJG 1) and he became a night fighter.

Night fighter career

Following the 1939 aerial Battle of the Heligoland Bight, RAF attacks shifted to the cover of darkness, initiating the Defence of the Reich campaign. By mid-1940, Generalmajor (Brigadier General) Josef Kammhuber had established a night air defense system dubbed the Kammhuber Line. It consisted of a series of control sectors equipped with radars and searchlights and an associated night fighter. Each sector named a Himmelbett (canopy bed) would direct the night fighter into visual range with target bombers. In 1941, the Luftwaffe started equipping night fighters with airborne radar such as the Lichtenstein radar. This airborne radar did not come into general use until early 1942.

Group commander
Ehle was appointed Gruppenkommandeur (group commander) of II. Gruppe of NJG 1 on 6 October 1940, succeeding Hauptmann Heinrich Graf von Stillfried und Rattonitz. His sixth night victory was a Bristol Blenheim shot down on 2 June 1942, and he had 16 victories in total by the end of 1942.

On 18 November 1943 Walter Ehle's  Bf-110 crashed near St. Trond, Belgium. As he was landing his airfield lights were extinguished; his aircraft crashed and he and his crew, Ofw. Leidenbach (Bordfunker—radio/wireless operator) and Uffz. Derlitzky (Bordschütze—aerial gunner), perished. He was succeeded by Major Eckart-Wilhelm von Bonin as commander of II. Gruppe of NJG 1.

Major Ehle was awarded the Knight's Cross of the Iron Cross on 29 August after 31 victories and at the time of his death he was credited with 39. He shot down a total of 38 enemy aircraft of which 35 were at night.

Summary of career

Aerial victory claims
According to Obermaier, Ehle was credited with 39—four daytime and 35 nighttime—aerial victories. Foreman, Parry and Mathews, authors of Luftwaffe Night Fighter Claims 1939 – 1945, researched the German Federal Archives and found records for 34 nocturnal victory claims. Mathews and Foreman also published Luftwaffe Aces — Biographies and Victory Claims, listing Ehle with 34 claims, including three as a Zerstörer pilot, plus three further unconfirmed claims.

Awards
 Aviator badge
 Front Flying Clasp of the Luftwaffe in Gold
 Spanish Cross in Gold with Swords (14 April 1939)
 Iron Cross (1939) 2nd and 1st Class
 German Cross in Gold on 20 October 1942 as Hauptmann in the II./Nachtjagdgeschwader 1
 Knight's Cross of the Iron Cross on 29 August 1943 as Major and Gruppenkommandeur of the II./Nachtjagdgeschwader 1

Notes

References

Citations

Bibliography

External links
TracesOfWar.com
Luftwaffe 39-45

1913 births
1943 deaths
People from Windhoek
Condor Legion personnel
German World War II flying aces
German military personnel of the Spanish Civil War
Recipients of the Gold German Cross
Recipients of the Knight's Cross of the Iron Cross
White Namibian people
Colonial people in German South West Africa
Aviators killed in aviation accidents or incidents in Belgium
Luftwaffe personnel killed in World War II
Burials at Lommel German war cemetery
Victims of aviation accidents or incidents in 1943